The Atlanta Independent was an African-American weekly newspaper published in Atlanta, Georgia, from 1903 to 1928.  It was one of the first African-American newspapers in Atlanta.  A Republican newspaper, it was started by Benjamin J. Davis, father of the civil rights activist Benjamin J. Davis Jr.

References

External links
Free issues of the Atlanta Independent from the Google News Archive

Defunct African-American newspapers
Newspapers published in Atlanta
Defunct newspapers published in Georgia (U.S. state)
African-American history of Georgia (U.S. state)